The 2010–11 ECHL season was the 23rd season of the ECHL. The regular season schedule ran from October 15, 2010, to April 2, 2011. The Kelly Cup playoffs followed the regular season, with the first playoff game held on April 4, 2011, and the final game (between the Alaska Aces and the Kalamazoo Wings) held on May 21, 2011. The league welcomed one new franchise, a relocation of the Johnstown Chiefs to Greenville, South Carolina, who played in the BI-LO Center. The ECHL held its annual All-Star Game and Skills Challenge on January 26 at Rabobank Arena in Bakersfield, California, home of the Bakersfield Condors.

League business

Team changes 
In February 2010, Charlotte Checkers owner Michael Kahn purchased the Albany River Rats of the American Hockey League from Capital District Sports and  the team relocated to Charlotte for the 2010–11 season. Rumors had surfaced that the franchise rights that were held by the Checkers would be transferred to an ownership group with plans of putting a team at the San Diego Sports Arena in San Diego, California, but instead Charlotte returned its franchise to the ECHL.

Also in February 2010, the Johnstown Chiefs, the only member from the original five teams to compete in the league's inaugural season to stay in its original city, announced that they would be relocating to Greenville, South Carolina, following the completion of the 2009–10 season. On February 15, 2010, the Greenville Arena District Board announced that they had agreed to a five-year deal to bring the Chiefs to Greenville's BI-LO Center and the ECHL Board of Governors approved the relocation of the Johnstown franchise to Greenville on February 17.

All-star game
The 2011 ECHL All-Star game was played on January 26, 2011, and was hosted by the Bakersfield Condors at Rabobank Arena. The format featured the host team Condors taking on the ECHL All-Star team. The All-Stars won 9–3.

Regular season 
Final league standings

Conference standings 
x – clinched playoff spot, y – clinched division title, z – clinched best conference record, e – eliminated from playoff contention

* – division leader

x – clinched playoff spot, y – clinched division title, b – clinched Brabham Cup, best record in the conference and first round bye, e – eliminated from playoff contention

* – division leader

Divisional standings 
Eastern Conference

Note: GP = Games played; W = Wins; L = Losses; T = Ties; OTL = Overtime loss; SOL = Shootout loss; GF = Goals for; GA = Goals against; Pts = Points

Western Conference

Note: GP = Games played; W = Wins; L = Losses; T = Ties; OTL = Overtime loss; SOL = Shootout loss; GF = Goals for; GA = Goals against; Pts = Points

2010–11 Kelly Cup Playoffs

2011 Kelly Cup playoffs format 
The format for the 2011 Kelly Cup playoffs remained unchanged from the previous season.

In the Eastern Conference, postseason berths were awarded to the first-place team in each division and the next five teams in the conference, based on points. The division winners were seeded first, second and third and played the eighth-place finisher, the seventh-place finisher and the sixth-place finisher, respectively, while the fourth-place finisher and the fifth-place finisher met. The conference semifinals had the winner of the first-place and eighth-place match-up meet the winner of the fourth-place and fifth-place game while the winner of the second-place and seventh-place game faced the winner of the third-place and sixth-place match-up.

In the Western Conference, postseason berths were awarded to the first-place team in each division and the next five teams in the conference, based on points. The division winner with the best record in the conference received a bye in the first round. The other division winner was seeded second and met the team that finished seventh in the conference in the first round. The other first round matchups were the third-place finisher in the conference against the sixth-place finisher in the conference and the fourth-place finisher in the conference against the fifth-place finisher in the conference. The conference semifinals had the first-place finisher meet the winner of the fourth-place and fifth-place matchup and the winner of the second-place finisher and seventh-place finisher against the winner of the third-place finisher and the sixth-place finisher.

The first round in each Conference was a best of five series with each subsequent round being a best of seven series.

Bracket

ECHL awards

All-ECHL Teams

ECHL All-Rookie Team

See also 
 2010 in sports
 2011 in sports

References 

 
2010-11
3
3